Madeleine Charlotte Fawkes ('Madge') (14 December 1880 Malta - 15 September 1954 Black Bourton) was an English botanical illustrator.

She studied at the Slade School of Fine Art. During visits to her brother Valentine Fawkes, who farmed near Ficksburg in South Africa, she painted the local flora, and was awarded the Grenfell Medal by the Royal Horticultural Society for her depictions of Lesotho wild flowers.

References

External links
Plant Illustrations

1880 births
1954 deaths
20th-century British women artists
Alumni of the Slade School of Fine Art
Botanical illustrators